Aníbal Roy González (born February 7, 1978 in Buenos Aires, Argentina) is an Argentine footballer currently playing for Nacional Potosí of the Primera División in Bolivia.

Teams
  Vélez Sársfield 1998-2000
  O'Higgins 2001
  Olimpo 2002-2003
  San Martín de Mendoza 2003
  Sport Boys 2004
  Manta 2005
  Atlético Tucumán 2005-2007
  La Florida 2007-2008
  Deportivo Aguilares 2008-2010
  Nacional Potosí 2011–present

References
 
 

1978 births
Living people
Argentine footballers
Argentine expatriate footballers
Olimpo footballers
Sport Boys footballers
Nacional Potosí players
Club Atlético Vélez Sarsfield footballers
Atlético Tucumán footballers
Universidad de Chile footballers
O'Higgins F.C. footballers
San Martín de Mendoza footballers
Chilean Primera División players
Argentine Primera División players
Expatriate footballers in Chile
Expatriate footballers in Peru
Expatriate footballers in Bolivia
Expatriate footballers in Ecuador
Footballers from Buenos Aires
Association footballers not categorized by position
Argentine expatriate sportspeople in Chile
Argentine expatriate sportspeople in Peru
Argentine expatriate sportspeople in Bolivia
Argentine expatriate sportspeople in Ecuador